This is a list of  regions of Arizona, United States
  

 
Region